Cinnamomum verum, called true cinnamon tree or Ceylon cinnamon tree, is a small evergreen tree belonging to the family Lauraceae, native to Sri Lanka. The inner bark of several other Cinnamomum species are also used to make cinnamon.

Description
Cinnamomum verum trees are 10–15 metres (30–50 feet) tall. The leaves are ovate-oblong in shape and 7–18 cm (3–7 inches) long. The flowers, which are arranged in panicles, have a greenish color and a distinct odour. The fruit is a purple 1cm drupe containing a single seed.

Cultivation
The old botanical synonym for the tree, Cinnamomum zeylanicum, is derived from Sri Lanka's former name, Ceylon. Sri Lanka still produces 80–90% of the world's supply of C. verum, which is also cultivated on a commercial scale in the Seychelles, Madagascar and Tanzania.

Cultivars
There are several different cultivars of Cinnamomum verum based on the taste of bark:
 Type 1 – ; 
 Type 2 – ; 
 Type 3 – ; 
 Type 4 – ; 
 Type 5 – ; 
 Type 6 – ; 
 Type 7 – ;

Medicinal uses 
Cinnamon has a long history of use in traditional medicine as a digestive aid.

Preliminary studies show that cinnamon could slow symptoms of Alzheimer's disease through the reduction of the oligomerization of beta-amyloid.

Processing
They are first harvested at 3 years old, and continue producing well for 40–50 years. Small side branches (1.5–5 cm in diameter) are removed from the trees. The outer bark is removed, and processed into mulch. Twigs, leaves and berries (seeds) are crushed and make cinnamon oil, a less valuable byproduct. The inner bark of the branches is loosened by being rubbed with a brass rod. The bark is then split with a brass or stainless steel knife and peeled off as intact as possible. Long, full 'quills' of cinnamon are more valuable than broken pieces. These quills are then dried over several days in the shade, then in darkness. All this work is done by hand by experienced workers; this is the most expensive part of producing cinnamon spice. Finally, the dried bark is cut into sticks or ground into powder for sale to consumers.

Gallery

References

External links
 
 

verum
Endemic flora of Sri Lanka
Trees of Sri Lanka
Plants described in 1825